Beyond the Limits is a 1992 book continuing the modeling of the consequences of a rapidly growing global population that was started in the 1972 report Limits to Growth. Donella Meadows, Dennis Meadows, and Jørgen Randers are the authors and all were involved in the original Club of Rome study as well.  Beyond the Limits (Chelsea Green Publishing Company) and Earthscan addressed many of the criticisms of the Limits to Growth book, but still has caused controversy and mixed reactions.

Reviews
"Society has gone into overshoot, … a state of being beyond limits without knowing it. These limits are more like speed limits than barriers at the end of the road: the rate at which renewable resources can renew themselves, the rate at which we can change from nonrenewable resources to renewable ones, and the rate at which nature can recycle our pollution. … [W]e are overshooting such crucial resources as food and water while overwhelming nature with pollutants like those causing global warming."

"Beyond the Limits recognizes that the future doesn't lie in tinkering with resource use or simply squelching population growth in developing countries. A sustainable future will require profound social and psychological readjustments in the developed and developing world."

"Current crop yields can only sustain the world's population at subsistence levels, … while nonrenewable energy resources and fresh water supplies are dwindling, and greenhouse gases and other pollutants increase. But while the prognosis is disaster within decades if nothing is done, there are encouraging signs. Technology offers greater efficiency in energy consumption and pollution control, international response to the ozone crisis has been relatively swift, and recycling efforts are gaining headway. [However] … the conditions underlying limit overshoots--population growth and resource depletion in a finite world, for example--remain unaddressed in the corridors of power."

Influence
Billionaire investor Richard Rainwater indicates having been influenced to invest in oil in the 1990s upon reading Beyond the Limits'. His niece Kelley Rainwater reports she gave him this book as a Christmas present. She was introduced to the book through Dr. Jay Earley who is a social transformation theorist and colleague of the Meadows.

See also
 Donella Meadows' twelve leverage points to intervene in a system
 World3
 Steady-state economy
 Peak Oil
 Limits to Growth
 The Ultimate Resource

References

1992 non-fiction books
1992 in the environment
Books about environmentalism
Environmental non-fiction books
Chelsea Green Publishing books